Rainha da Sucata (Portuguese for Queen of Scrap) is a Brazilian telenovela that first aired on TV Globo from April 2 to October 26, 1990, in 179 episodes.

Production 

Rainha da Sucata was the first soap opera "from 8" written by Sílvio de Abreu, who until then had signed several plots presented at 7 pm. He was assigned to write a humorous soap opera for 8 pm. At this time, there was a determination by Rede Globo's Teledrama Department to avoid presenting overly dramatic plots at this time, which began with the screening of O Salvador da Pátria. However, this proposal only prevailed at the beginning of the plot. Due to the public's rejection of excessive comedy (a factor noted at the hearing), as of June 1990, author Silvio de Abreu decided to put the comedy in the background and focus more on the drama.

Still in June 1990, the plot began to show longer chapters. The goal was to soften the impact that the novel Pantanal had on later programs. This action also caused Pantanal to lose publicity because it started later and later. In addition, the "scenes from the next chapter" section has also been extinguished.

The Collor Plan, which was an economic plan implemented by then Brazilian President Fernando Collor de Mello, was incorporated into the story of Rainha da Sucata. Globo has been accused of knowing Collor's intentions and not warning the population of such a plan. But what actually happened was that, because of this government plan, many scenes that were already done had to be rewritten to adapt to reality.

In the middle of the plot, Silvio de Abreu had to get away from work. Gilberto Braga replaced him and wrote 9 chapters.

The villain Laurinha had its outcome 8 chapters before the end of the novel. In Chapter 171, aired on October 17, 1990, she commits suicide by throwing herself from the Junk Building. But the mystery of his death is one of the leading threads of the final line of the plot. Three different endings were written for the novel, to keep the secret about the end of the character Maria do Carmo.

Plot 

Set in São Paulo, the plot of Rainha da Sucata portrays the universe of the new rich and the decadent São Paulo elite contrasting two female characters, the emerging Maria do Carmo Pereira (Regina Duarte) and the failed socialite Laurinha Albuquerque Figueroa (Gloria Menezes). Maria do Carmo gets rich from her father's business, the junkyard salesman Onofre (Lima Duarte), and becomes a successful businesswoman, but keeps the habits of her humble past. She lives with her father and mother, Neiva (Nicette Bruno), in the Santana neighborhood of northern São Paulo.

In love with Edu Figueroa (Tony Ramos) a good life that had despised and humiliated her in her youth, she decides to “buy it”: she proposes to marry him to help his family, traditionally but on the verge of bankruptcy. Edu accepts the proposal, and the emerging, after marriage, will live in the Figueroa mansion, in the Jardins, sophisticated city stronghold. In the new house, Maria do Carmo begins to live a nightmare because of Laurinha. Married to Betinho (Paulo Gracindo), Edu's father, the socialite is obsessed with her stepson and goes out of her way to conquer him, and will not leave the "junk" Maria do Carmo in peace.

In addition to Laurinha's bad marriage and persecution, the businesswoman begins to see her business go wrong because of administrator Renato Maia (Daniel Filho), whom she fully trusted. Renato, in fact, is a corrupt man who puts a blow to Maria do Carmo. The executive marries Mariana (Renata Sorrah), a fragile and wealthy woman who suffers from threats from her husband, who only married her out of interest in her fortune. Mariana is the sister of Caio (Antonio Fagundes), a stuttering paleontologist who is torn between the bride, the fiery Nicinha (Marisa Orth) and the cabaret dancer, Adriana Ross (Cláudia Raia), who is the daughter of villain Laurinha Figueroa.

The plot was also marked by Armenian Owner Aracy Balabanian, Armenian who has lived in Brazil for years with her children Gera (Marcello Novaes), Gino (Jandir Ferrari) and Gerson (Gerson Brenner), who treats as if they were babies. Gerson, by the way, is Maria do Carmo's right-hand man in the company, with whom she gets involved early in the plot. The three brothers will later dispute the love of young Ingrid (Andrea Beltrão), daughter of the exquisite Mrs. Isabelle (Cleyde Yáconis). In the middle of the plot, Dona Armenia discovers shady business between her late husband and Maria do Carmo's father and owns the territory where Maria do Carmo's company is built, a building in the middle of Paulista Avenue and decides to demolish the building. . Your phrase "I'm going to put this building on chon!" marked the plot and the character. Instead she takes Maria do Carmo's company that picks up scrap metal on the street again. However, as soon as Maria do Carmo recovers with the discovery that Caio and Mariana were her brothers, they pass their shares of "Do Carmo Veiculos" to her, who returns in time to save the company from all the chaos and mess that Dona Armenia has. made ready with his mismanagement.

Other plots also deserve mention, such as the journalist Paula (Claudia Ohana), who in love with the work, ends up getting involved with Edu and goes on to write stories about the fall of the Albuquerque Figueroa family. Still in the plot is Jonas (Raul Cortez), who later finds himself to be Paula's mysterious father, a serious, friendly man who notes everything that goes on at the Figueroa mansion where he works as a butler and keeps great secrets about his past and his mysterious involvement with Isabelle.

Cast

Reception
Marisa Orth won the 1990 Associação Paulista dos Críticos de Artes Award for Best Female Newcomer.

References

External links
 

TV Globo telenovelas
1990 Brazilian television series debuts
1990 Brazilian television series endings
1990 telenovelas
Brazilian telenovelas
Portuguese-language telenovelas
Television series about revenge